Laticauda guineai is a sea snake in the family Elapidae first described by Heatwole, Busack and Cogger in 2005. It is native to waters off southern New Guinea.

References

guineai
Reptiles described in 2005
Taxa named by Harold F. Heatwole